The Damned is a 2009 Spanish drama film directed by Isaki Lacuesta from a screenplay by Lacuesta and Isa Campo. Its cast features Daniel Fanego, Arturo Goetz, María Fiorentino, Leonor Manso, Nazareno Casero, Juana Hidalgo, and Bárbara Lennie.

Plot 
Former guerrilla fighter Raúl recalls former pal Martín to South America from the latter's Spanish exile after 30 years. Raúl is trying to find the corpse of a common partner, Ezequiel.

Cast

Production 
The film was produced by Benecé Produccions in association with Televisió de Catalunya, and with the participation of TVE. It was shot in  Argentina, Peru, and Spain (including Barcelona).

Release 
The film screened at the 57th San Sebastián International Film Festival on 25 September 2022, closing the festival's official selection slate. It was theatrically released in Spain on 20 November 2009.

Reception 
Jonathan Holland of Variety deemed The Damned to be "hushed, intense and admirable", pointing out that "silence speaks louder than words" in the film.

Sergi Sánchez of Fotogramas rated the film 4 out of 5 stars, highlighting a couple of tremendous sequence shots as the film's standout, while citing a scene with Nazareno's character shooting an animal as a negative point.

Toni Vall of Cinemanía rated the film 3 out of 5 stars, deeming it to be a "an abrupt, imperfect and somewhat emphatic film, but undoubtedly interesting".

Accolades 

|-
| align = "center" | 2009 || 57th San Sebastián International Film Festival || colspan = "2" | FIPRESCI Award ||  || align = "center" | 
|-
| rowspan = "2" align = "center" | 2010 || 2nd Gaudí Awards || colspan = "2" | Best Film Not in the Catalan Language ||  || 
|-
| 54th Sant Jordi Awards || Best Spanish Actress || Bárbara Lennie ||  || 
|}

See also 
 List of Spanish films of 2009

References 

Spanish drama films
2000s Spanish-language films
2000s Spanish films
2009 drama films
Films shot in Barcelona
Films shot in Argentina
Films shot in Peru
Films set in South America